Le Perrier is a commune in the Vendée department in the Pays de la Loire region in western France.

Geography

Climate

Le Perrier has a oceanic climate (Köppen climate classification Cfb).

See also
Communes of the Vendée department

References

Communes of Vendée